Eric John Bergbusch is a former Canadian diplomat. He was appointed concurrently as Ambassador Extraordinary And Plenipotentiary to Madagascar and Comoros and as High Commissioner to Mauritius, Seychelles and Tanzania. He was also later appointed concurrently as Ambassador Extraordinary and Plenipotentiary to Poland and the German Democratic Republic.

References

External links 
 Foreign Affairs and International Trade Canada Complete List of Posts

Year of birth missing (living people)
Living people
Ambassadors of Canada to the Comoros
Ambassadors of Canada to Madagascar
High Commissioners of Canada to Mauritius
High Commissioners of Canada to Seychelles
High Commissioners of Canada to Tanzania
Ambassadors of Canada to Poland
Ambassadors of Canada to East Germany